Jaklin Dencheva Zlatanova (born 25 September 1988) is a Bulgarian female basketball player currently competing for WBC Beroe in the Bulgarian League. Zlatanova is considered to be among the most talented athletes in the country which in the past used to be among the most successful nations in the European female basketball.

Jaklin Zlatanova was born on 25 September 1988 in the capital Sofia, where she spent most of her childhood in the family with long-run basketball tradition. Her mother Krassimira Banova had been a very successful basketball player, and with the team of Levski(Sofia) she won Euro league competition in 1984, Ronchetti cup in 1979 and other awards as well before she retired.

National team: 2003–2021

Zlatanova has been part of the Bulgarian national team since 2003 when she competed for the first time with the Cadettes team on the European Championship Challenge Round. Since then she has played more than 100 games with the youth and women's representative team of the country.

However, Bulgaria has not played in the European Championship for more than 20 years despite the efforts of three generations of female basketball players. Due to the three major injuries in the period, 2012-2014 Zlatanova missed one Round of the European Qualifications in 2014. The last time she took part of the official's games, during the EuroBasket campaign in 2013, she was the top scorer for her team with an average of 14.1 Points, 6.1 Rebounds and 1.5 Assist per game.

Bulgarian National team statistics

Club career: 2005–2021

Most of her career Zlatanova has spent abroad, mainly in French and Spanish teams. In 2005 she was part of the Tarbes GB in southwest France where she made her debut on the European scene in the Euroleague competition. Having spent four years in the club (2005-2008), Zlatanova decided to move to Spain in Extrugasa's team at the beginning of 2009 season. She played in the EuroCup competition with an average of 14.3 points, 2.8 rebounds and 0.8 assists per game.

In the following season 2010-2011, she joined the Grand Canaria's team. Following up on the former success, the squad took part in the Eurocup competition with Zlatanova being one of the most important players with an average of 11.2 points, 7.4 rebounds and 1.4 assists per game. With the relatively young club Mann Filter Zaragoza, she began her seventh consecutive season in the European competitions, eventually ending up with an average of 10.2 points, six rebounds and 1.4 assists per game.

Moreover, the most significant step in athlete's career was when she signed Rival Ecopolis in 2013. Unfortunately, during the training period, before the official start of the season, the athlete underwent rapture of the Achilles tendon which was the first out of three serious injuries. After four months of recovering she was able to play just a couple of games before the second intervention on the same leg. Having missed the entire season, Jaklin Zlatanova decided to go back to Bulgaria, where she signed contract with Dunav 8806 Ruse in 2013. The first couple of rehabilitation months went very well, and she was even able to compete in the Eurocup again, becoming the most important player on the team with an average of 12.4 points, 6.2 rebounds and 1.4 assists per game. The end of the remaining season was over when she got injured her left knee and underwent an operation in January 2014.

Season 2013–2014

After ten years abroad Zlatanova returned home for the season 2013-2014 with the team of Dunav 8806 Ruse. The club confirmed their participation in the EuroCup, and the presence in the composition of Zlatanova gave them great hopes for good performance. Unfortunately, the existence of strong clubs from Turkey and Russia left the inexperienced team of Dunav 8806 at the bottom of the points table, and they had to focus their efforts only on the local league. Having recovered from the second Achilles tendon operation, Zlatanova was very close to becoming one of the most important players in the squad but unlucky she injured her left knee in one of the last games before the Christmas break. The medical examinations showed rupture of the ties of her knee, and she underwent a new intervention in early 2014. For the entire season, 2013-2014 Jaklin Zlatanova participated in 11 games with an average of 12.4 points, 5.2 rebounds and 1.5 assists per game. Meanwhile, Dunav 8806 Ruse continued competing in the league, being in position for the gold medal. Without Zlatanova they managed to defeat the strong team of Levski Sofia and to become the champions for the fourth time in their history.

Season 2014–2015

After a long recovery, which lasted nearly nine months, the athlete was ready for her second season with the Dunav 8806. She played 31 games of the regular season and playoffs in 27 of which she has started. For the entire season, Zlatanova scored an average of 11.3 points, 7.4 rebounds, and 2.5 assists. Also, the lineup took part in the Bulgarian Cup competition where was eliminated in the semifinals, but Zlatanova reinforced its strong position by becoming one of the top three scorers of the tournament. However, this was not enough for her team, and competitors from Ruse won only the bronze medal. Just a month later the basketball players had the opportunity to revenge for the loss, and in the final playoff series against Neftohimik Bourgas, they eventually won the title after 3-0 in the series.

Season 2015–2016

Season 2017–2018

The magical trio is now back! Having missed out the entire 2016-2017 season due to the pregnancy, Zlatanova joined Gaby Ocete and Pao Ferrari and started her second season with the jersey of Mann Filer Stadium Casablanca.

Season 2019–2020

In 2019 Jaklin signed with WBC Beroe, which is competing in the National Women's Basketball leagues in Bulgaria. Below is her statistics for the current season.

WBC Beroe also participates in the WABA League, which is the regional basketball league, featuring female teams from Serbia, Montenegro, Bosnia and Herzegovina, Bulgaria, Slovenia, and Croatia. For the season 2019-2020, Zlatanova has played 12 games with 8.8 points per game and nine rebounds. See the statistics below.

Season 2020–2021

In the current 2020-2021 season, Zlatanova renewed her contract with the team of WBC Beroe. However, due to the COVID-19 pandemic, the women's basketball league competitions in Bulgaria have been suspended.

External links
Profile at eurobasket.com
Profile at fibaeurope.com
Roster Dunav 8806 2014-2015 at dunav8806.com
A bright year ahead Zlatanova at fibaeurope.com
Zlatanova lifts lid on dealing with serious injury setbacks at fiba.com
Jaklin Zlatanova será operada de nuevo y dice adiós a la temporada at rivasactual.com
Injury knocks Zlatanova out of action at fibaeurope.com
Lesión de Jaklin Zlatanova at zonadostres.com
Rivas Ecopolis lose Jaklin Zlatanova to a torn Achilles at lovewomenbasketball.com
Another Achilles surgery for Jaklin Zlatanova, season definitely over at lovewomenbasketball.com
Dunav 8806 adds Jaklin Zlatanova at lovewomenbasketball.com
Torn ACL for Dunav’s Jaklin Zlatanova at lovewomenbasketball.com
El Rivas se refuerza con la búlgara Jaklin Zlatanova at baloncesto.as.com
Grave lesión de Zlatanova at encancha.com
El Mann Filter renueva a la pívot búlgara Jaklin Zlatanova at elperiodicodearagon.com
Espagne : Jaklin ZLATANOVA blessée at paperblog.fr
Espagne : Fin de saison pour Jaklin ZLATANOVA (Rivas) at http://www.paperblog.fr
La jugadora del Rivas Ecópolis, Jaklin Zlatanova, será operada de nuevo de su tendón de aquiles at thewangconnection.com
Grave lesión de Zlatanova at encancha.com
Dunav takes 2-0 lead in Bulgarian league finals at https://web.archive.org/web/20150515112247/http://lovewomensbasketball.com/
La búlgara Jaklin Zlatanova firma por MANN-FILTER at stadiumcasablanca.com
Mann Filter signs Bulgarian power forward Jaklin Zlatanova at https://web.archive.org/web/20150515112247/http://lovewomensbasketball.com/
at http://www.feb.es
at http://www.zonadostres.com
at http://www.acb.com
at http://www.marca.com
at http://www.lebplata.es
Beroe adds Jaklin Zlatanova at power forward  at waba-league.com

Social media
Personal page at facebook.com

References

1988 births
Living people
Bulgarian women's basketball players
Bulgarian expatriate sportspeople in Spain
Power forwards (basketball)
Basketball players from Sofia
Tarbes Gespe Bigorre players